is a railway station in Nishi-ku, Nagoya, Aichi Prefecture, Japan.

Lines

 (Station number: T03)

Layout

Platforms

References

External links 
 

Railway stations in Japan opened in 1984
Railway stations in Aichi Prefecture